The Polillo forest frog (Platymantis polillensis) is a species of frog in the family Ceratobatrachidae.
It is endemic to the Philippines, where it occurs on Polillo Island and the adjacent coast of Aurora Province, Luzon. The name "Polillo" means "beautiful island with plenty of food." Locally, it is called "kabakab." The species of frog has previously been considered as critically endangered, as its habitat on Polillo Island had been razed for coconut farming, leaving only 4 squared kilometers of land. But, after a researcher recognized its mating call on another island, it had been discovered that the Polillo forest frog was widespread across the Camarines Norte, Quezon, and Aurora provinces of Luzon.

The Polillo forest frog has a diet consisting of insects found on the island of Luzon and Polillo. 

Its natural habitats are subtropical or tropical dry forest, subtropical or tropical moist lowland forest, and subtropical or tropical moist montane forest.
It is threatened by habitat loss.

References
2. Borrell, Brendan. "THE SPY WHO LOVED FROGS." Nature, vol. 501, no. 7466, 2013, pp. 150-3. . 

3. Brown, Rafe M. “Amphibians and Reptiles, Luzon Island, Aurora Province and Aurora Memorial National Park, Northern Philippines: New Island Distribution Records.” KU ScholarWorks, Check List, 1 Jan. 1970, kuscholarworks.ku.edu/handle/1808/10747.

4. Bernabe, K. J. C. (2013, November 28). Polillo folk as Guardians of biodiversity. https://newsinfo.inquirer.net/536223/polillo-folk-as-guardians-of-biodiversity.

5. Harwood, J., Wilkin, D., Kraus, D., Gray-Wilson, N., Brainard, J., Johnson, S., … Karasov, C. (2019, November 20). Frogs and Toads. CK. https://www.ck12.org/biology/frogs-and-toads/lesson/Frogs-and-Toads-MS-LS/.

Platymantis
Amphibians of the Philippines
Endemic fauna of the Philippines
Fauna of Luzon
Taxonomy articles created by Polbot
Amphibians described in 1922